Bouvelinghem is a commune in the Pas-de-Calais department in the Hauts-de-France region in northern France.

Geography
A village situated 10 miles (16 km) west of Saint-Omer, on the D208 road. It was completely destroyed by fire in 1876.

Population

Sights
 The church of the Assumption, dating from the early 20th century.
 The ruins of a chateau.

See also
Communes of the Pas-de-Calais department

References

Communes of Pas-de-Calais